Balmacewen Intermediate School is a state co-educational intermediate school located in Wakari, Dunedin, New Zealand. It has 18 regular classrooms and 4 technology classes, involving Hard Materials, Food Technology, Textiles, and Art.

Famous Alumni 
Kushana Bush – artist
Clare Curran – Member of Parliament
Matt Heath – New Zealand actor

References

Intermediate schools in New Zealand
Schools in Dunedin